Al-Ameen Mission is a residential educational institute founded in 1987 with the goal of providing education and social services to underprivileged communities. It is located in the village Khalatpur in Howrah district of West Bengal, India. It is now spread across 18 districts of the state with 76 branches. Currently, about 12 thousand residential students attend. About 20 thousand students have attended the institute.

History 
The Secretary-General of the Mission, Nurul Islam, set up the Khalatpur Junior High Madrasa in 1976, when he was still studying his tenth standard. In May 1984, he started the Institute of Islamic Culture, setting up a hostel for the institute in 1986 in the Madrasa building itself, supplying it with the collection of one fistful of rice from every home in his village, Khalatpur. In January 1987, it was renamed to Al-Ameen Mission, inspired by the Al-Ameen Educational Society of Dr. Mumtaj Ahmed Khan and Ramkrishna mission. It was later financially supported by industrialist Mustaque Hossain and many others.

Al-Ameen Mission follows the curriculum of the West Bengal Board of Secondary Education, but is transitioning to CBSE. A few new branches have been started, which are following the CBSE curriculum.
In 2002, it was awarded "The Telegraph School Award for Excellence" which is shared with the South Point High School.

Activities 
As well as being an educational institute, Al-Ameen Mission also performs charitable work for the Muslim community. It has helped unemployed Muslims with loans and has started scholarship programs to help other communities' needy students.

On 19 May 2015, Al-Ameen Mission received the Banga Bhushan Award. For the past several years Al Ameen Mission has been lauded for lifting the underprivileged kids to the profession and out of poverty.

On 29 January 2023, Al-Ameen Mission started new residential school for orphan of class 2 to 4 named Amar Bari Shanti Neer (My home, peace home).

Funding 
Al-Ameen Mission is funded through donations from individuals, corporations, and the government. The mission is mostly run by donation and zakat. Muslims throughout the country contribute their zakat to the Mission, which takes care of 25% of seats reserved for the poor, destitute, and orphans. It has received funding from many sources such as Pataka Industries Pvt. Limited, the Maulana Azad Education Foundation and the Board of Waqfs, West Bengal.

Campus 

The Al-Ameen Mission has established several campuses across India, providing education and social services to underprivileged communities in multiple states. These campuses serve as centers of learning and provide a safe and supportive environment for students to grow and develop. The main campus of Mission, Al-Ameen Mission for Boys, is located at Khalatpur, Howrah.

In addition to academic facilities, the Al-Ameen campuses also provide social services such as healthcare and counseling.

The Al-Ameen Mission campuses serve as hubs of community engagement, bringing together individuals from diverse backgrounds to work towards a common goal of education and social advancement. Through its various programs and services, the organization is helping to build stronger, more resilient communities and create a better future for all.

Management 

The main campus of Mission, Al-Ameen Mission is managed by a school board. The board of the main campus is also in charge of maintaining other sites. Across West Bengal, Al Ameen runs about 50 schools in total. Most of them are directly run by Al Ameen Mission and a few are located in remote village areas which are run by local non-profits for better management and service. These schools are listed as in "Collaboration with Al Ameen Mission." Aside from the details of management, these schools are identical to Al Ameen Mission's schools.

Teachers of Al-Ameen

The teachers of Al-Ameen Mission play a crucial role in the organization's goal of providing quality education to underprivileged communities. These dedicated individuals are responsible for delivering instruction and guiding students towards academic success.  Al-Ameen Mission has a large number of permanent teachers as well as visiting teachers from some reputed schools and colleges. The visiting teachers are often long-term associates of Al-Ameen, but not all of them are.

The teachers of Al-Ameen are not only knowledgeable and skilled in their subject areas but also possess a deep commitment to the well-being of their students and the communities they serve. Through their hard work and dedication, these teachers are helping to build a better future for the students and communities they serve.

In conclusion, Al-Ameen Mission is a noble organization dedicated to improving the lives of underprivileged communities through education and social services. The impact of its work is significant and has changed the lives of many individuals for the better.

References 

High schools and secondary schools in West Bengal
1986 establishments in West Bengal
Educational institutions established in 1986